Rosalyn Tureck (December 14, 1913 – July 17, 2003) was an American pianist and harpsichordist who was particularly associated with the music of Johann Sebastian Bach. However, she had a wide-ranging repertoire that included works by composers Ludwig van Beethoven, Johannes Brahms and Frédéric Chopin, as well as more modern composers such as David Diamond, Luigi Dallapiccola and William Schuman. Diamond's Piano Sonata No. 1 was inspired by Tureck's playing.

Biography
Rosalyn Tureck was born in Chicago, Illinois, the third of three daughters of Russian Jewish immigrants Samuel Tureck (né Turk; Rosalyn’s father was of Turkish descent) and Monya (Lipson) Tureck. She was the granddaughter of a cantor from Kiev. The first of her teachers to recognize her special gifts for playing the music of Bach was the Javanese-born Dutch pianist Jan Chiapusso, who gave her twice-weekly lessons in Chicago from 1929-31 and also introduced her to the sounds of exotic instruments and ensembles such as the Javanese gamelan.

At Tuley High School (closed 1974), Tureck was a friend and classmate of future Nobel Prize–winning novelist Saul Bellow, who graduated in January 1932. The two remained in contact for decades.

"My technique was grounded, from my earliest years of study, in the school of Mendelssohn as passed on by Anton Rubinstein and many of his pupils, one of whom, Sophia Brilliant-Liven, was my teacher. It's essentially a finger technique, not a chordal one." Tureck reports that Brilliant-Liven was a stern teacher. "During the years I was with her, from the ages of 9 to 13, she never praised my playing." However, she made up for this, Tureck said, with a single compliment given to 13-year old Tureck after her performance in the semi-finals of a piano competition in which 80,000 young pianists participated. Brilliant-Liven told young Tureck, "If I had been listening from outside the auditorium, I would have sworn it was Anton Rubinstein himself playing." Tureck went on to the finals, and to win first prize in the competition.

She continued her musical studies in Chicago with pianist and harpsichordist Gavin Williamson. She later studied at the Juilliard School in New York City, where one of her teachers was Leon Theremin. She made her debut at Carnegie Hall playing the electronic instrument invented by Theremin, the eponymously named theremin. In 1940, Turek joined the piano faculty of the Mannes School of Music. Later in her career, she joined the faculty at Juilliard as a teacher.

For a while she followed Wanda Landowska in playing Bach's keyboard music on a harpsichord but later returned to playing the piano. In 1970, Tureck performed in Boston for the Peabody Mason Concert series. She was an honorary fellow of St Hilda's College, Oxford.

In a CBC radio special on Glenn Gould, the host told Tureck that Gould cited her as his "only" influence. She responded by stating that she was an influence and that it was very kind of him to say so.

In 1990 she served on the jury of the Paloma O'Shea Santander International Piano Competition.

During 2000 and 2001, Tureck lived in Spain teaching and practicing every day of the week, specifically in Estepona, Málaga, where she remained for a year in retirement 

Tureck was among the founders of the Music Academy of the West summer conservatory in 1947.

She died in New York City in 2003, aged 89. Her scores and recordings were given to the Music Division and the Rodgers & Hammerstein Archives of Recorded Sound, both divisions of the New York Public Library for the Performing Arts.

Notes

External links

Tureck Bach Research Institute
On Tureck and Gould

, WNCN-FM, 6-Nov-1981
, WNCN-FM, 13-Nov-1981
Jewish Women's Archive

American harpsichordists
Jewish classical pianists
1913 births
2003 deaths
Musicians from Chicago
Juilliard School alumni
Juilliard School faculty
Bach musicians
Piano pedagogues
American women classical pianists
American classical pianists
20th-century classical pianists
20th-century American women pianists
20th-century American pianists
Educators from Illinois
American women educators
20th-century conductors (music)
Music Academy of the West founders